The Hard Road is the fourth studio album by Australian hip hop group Hilltop Hoods. Released on 1 April 2006 by Obese Records, it debuted at number one on the Australia ARIA Albums Chart, and was the first album by Australian artists to achieve that position. It contains the top 20 single "Clown Prince". It achieved Gold status (35,000 units) on 8 April 2006, a week after release, and has now surpassed Platinum status (70,000 units).

At the J Award of 2006, it won the Australian Album of the Year. announced on 1 December. It was also nominated for four awards at the ARIA Music Awards of 2006, winning Best Independent Release and Best Urban Release.

Five of the album's songs placed on the annual Triple J Hottest 100 chart announced on 26 January 2007: "Recapturing the Vibe" (#77), "Stopping All Stations" (#56), "What a Great Night" (#41), "Clown Prince" (#23) and "The Hard Road" (#3). "An Audience with the Devil" samples the spoken parts (the interview between Suffa and the Devil) from the Millennium episode "Somehow, Satan Got Behind Me".

Background
The Hard Road's lead single, "Clown Prince", reached the top 30 on the related ARIA Singles Chart. This featured guest verses from New York rapper, Omni, and British MCs, Mystro and Braintax. Hilltop Hoods received the inaugural Australian Independent Record (AIR) Award for Independent Artist of the Year and Best Performing Independent Album for The Hard Road in 2006. The track, "The Blue Blooded", is a collaboration with Australian MCs: Funkoars, Hau from Koolism, Mortar, Vents, Drapht, Muph & Plutonic, Pegz and Robby Balboa. On 27 April of the same year, Hilltop Hoods performed at the Bass in the Grass music festival in Darwin alongside fellow hip hop group, The Herd. That same day they issued a second single, the title track from the album. Its music video includes fellow members from the Certified Wise Crew – Cross Bred Mongrels, Terrafirma and Funkoars.

Following the success of The Hard Road Tour in early 2006, the Hilltop Hoods began their second national tour for the year, The Stopping All Stations Tour, which visited more regional areas of Australia as well as the capital cities. They were supported by Koolism and Mystro. Late that year, Hilltop Hoods released their third single from the album, "What a Great Night". The video shows the group at a club with camera shots panning up and down to reveal a new location. It used special effects and is one of the most expensive video clips for an Australian hip hop group, mirroring the group's rise in success and popularity. Also late in the year the band won the J Award for best album of the year from Triple J. They performed the Homebake Festival and Falls Festival before the end of the year. The Hard Road received the AIR Award for Best Independent Hip Hop/Urban Release in 2007.

Track listing

Secret track and extra material
Video clip of the first single "Clown Prince" is available for viewing on the CD.
Untitled secret track ("Ya Feel Big?", which works only on some stereos) - to access this track, start on track 1, "Recapturing the Vibe", and scan backwards. The song is about Hilltop Hoods' rise to fame and the struggles they endured because of this rise.

Song credits
Due to the MCs Suffa and Pressure performing different verses and choruses of varying songs, the sections done by DJ Debris and the large number of guest artists featured on the album, what follows is an extensive list of song credits.

"Recapturing the Vibe" - 3:26
Produced by Suffa
Verse 1: Pressure
Verse 2: Suffa
Scratches by DJ Debris
"Clown Prince" - 3:52
Produced by Debris
Verse 1: Suffa
Verse 2: Pressure & ct
Verse 3: Suffa & Pressure
Scratches by DJ Debris
Contains samples of "Laying Pipe" by Pornosonic, "Excursions" by A Tribe Called Quest and "Things Done Changed" by Notorious B.I.G.
"The Hard Road" - 4:06
Produced by Suffa
Verse 1: Suffa
Verse 2: Pressure
Verse 3: Suffa
Scratches by DJ Debris
Contains a sample of "Out in the Woods" by Leon Russell
"Stopping All Stations" - 3:52
Produced by Suffa
Performed by Pressure
Scratches by DJ Debris
Contains samples of "Ego Trippin' (Part II)" by De La Soul and "1-800 Suicide" by Gravediggaz
"Conversations from a Speakeasy" featuring Omni - 3:28
(M. Lambert/D. Smith/B. Francis/J. McDonald)
Produced by Suffa
Verse 1: Pressure
Verse 2: Omni
Verse 3: Suffa
Scratches by DJ Debris
Contains a sample of "You Gots to Chill" by EPMD
"What a Great Intro" - 0:24
"What a Great Night DNR" - 3:06
Produced & performed by Suffa
Scratches by DJ Debris
Contains a sample of "For Pete's Sake" by Pete Rock & C.L. Smooth
"City of Light" - 3:40
Produced by Suffa
Verse 1: Suffa
Verse 2: Pressure
Scratches by DJ Debris
Bass guitar by Chris Lambert
Electric guitar by Nick Lambert
"Obese Lowlifes" featuring Mystro and Braintax - 2:24
(M. Lambert/D. Smith/B. Francis/K. Dafarmo/J. Christie)
Produced by Suffa
Verse 1: Mystro
Verse 2: Pressure
Verse 3: Braintax
Verse 4: Suffa
Scratches by DJ Debris
Contains samples of "These Walls Don't Lie" by Promoe
"Circuit Breaker" 3:29
(M. Lambert/D. Smith/B. Francis/D. Rankine)
Produced by Trials
Verse 1: Suffa
Verse 2: Pressure
Scratches by DJ Debris
Contains samples of "Professor Booty" by Beastie Boys and "Buddy" by De La Soul
"Breathe" - 3:15
Produced by Suffa
Performed by Pressure
Scratches by DJ Debris
Bass Guitar by Chris Lambert
Trumpet by Phil Ingram
Contains a sample of "Unbelieveable"  by Notorious B.I.G.
"The Blue Blooded" featuring Blue Blooded Allstars - 4:47
(M. Lambert/D. Smith/B. Francis/R. Mortimer/D. Rankine/A. Baker/L. Latukefu/P. Ridge/J. Laroner/D. Young/T. Staff/R. Warren/M. Honson)
Produced by Suffa
Introduction: Trials
Verse 1: Suffa
Verse 2: Mortar
Verse 3: Trials and Sesta
Verse 4: Hau
Verse 5: Drapht
Verse 6: Vents
Verse 7: Muphin and Pegz
Verse 8: Robby Balboa
Verse 9: Honz
Verse 10: Pressure
"Monsters Ball" - 4:19
(M. Lambert/D. Smith/B. Francis/A. Simmons)
Produced by Simplex
Verse 1: Suffa
Verse 2: Pressure
"An Audience with the Devil" - 4:06
(M. Lambert/D. Smith/B. Francis/D. Rankine)
Produced by Trials
Performed by Suffa
Contains samples from an episode of Millennium entitled "Somehow, Satan Got Behind Me"
"The Captured Vibe" featuring DJ Reflux - 2:12
(M. Lambert/D. Smith/B. Francis/D. Yates)
Produced by Suffa
Scratches by DJ Reflux
"I Can't Take It" (deluxe edition Bonus Track)
(M. Lambert/D. Smith/B. Francis/D. Rankine)
Produced by Trials
Verse 1: Suffa
Verse 2: Pressure

Charts

Weekly charts

Year-end charts

Certifications

References

Obese Records albums
2006 albums
ARIA Award-winning albums
Hilltop Hoods albums